The Macao Tea Culture House is a museum about tea in São Lázaro, Macau, China.

History
The museum building was originally part of Yu Garden. The museum was opened on 1 June 2005.

Architecture

Exhibitions
The museum features tea cultures and history of Macau, Mainland China and the Western world.

See also
 List of museums in Macau

References

2005 establishments in Macau
Macau Peninsula
Museums established in 2005
Museums in Macau
Tea museums